Bruce Lundgren (11 November 1931 – 8 May 2003) was an Australian rules footballer who played with St Kilda in the Victorian Football League (VFL).

Notes

External links 

2003 deaths
1931 births
Australian rules footballers from Victoria (Australia)
St Kilda Football Club players